Pamber Heath is a village in north Hampshire, England.  Situated within the civil parish of Pamber, the village lies at the north end of Pamber Forest.

Governance
Pamber Heath is part of the parish of Pamber, which covers Pamber Heath, Pamber End, Pamber Green and Little London. The parish council meets in Pamber Heath Memorial Hall and St. Stephen's Hall, Little London.

Pamber Heath is within the ward of Pamber and Silchester, part of the Basingstoke and Deane Borough Council, and returns two councillors to the borough council.

Transport
There is a village link minibus service which serves Pamber Heath, Silchester and Mortimer West End. It is necessary to pre-book this service by contacting Hampshire County Council.

References

External links

Villages in Hampshire